Karl Gustav Ackermann (10 April 1820 in Elsterberg - 1 March 1901 in Dresden) was a German conservative politician for German Conservative Party. He was a member of the Reichstag and the Saxon State Parliament.

Biography

After graduating from high school in Grimma, Ackermann studied at the University of Leipzig from 1840 to 1843, and from 1843 to 1845 in Heidelberg. In 1840 he became a member of the Old Leipzig Burschenschaft. In 1841 he became active in the Corps Misnia Leipzig. He began his legal career in 1845 as a clerk in Königsbrück (Saxony), and from 1847 to 1849 as a council actuary at the Dresden city council. In 1849 he settled in Dresden as an independent lawyer and notary.

Literature

Elvira Döscher, Wolfgang Schröder : Saxon parliamentarians 1869–1918. The deputies of the Second Chamber of the Kingdom of Saxony in the mirror of historical photographs. A biographical handbook (= photo documents on the history of parliamentarism and political parties. Volume 5). Droste, Düsseldorf 2001, pp. 339–340.
Helge Dvorak: Biographical Lexicon of the German Burschenschaft. Volume I: Politicians. Volume 7: Supplement A – K. Winter, Heidelberg 2013, pp. 1–2.
Eckhard Hansen, Florian Tennstedt (Eds.) Volume 1: Social politicians in the German Empire 1871 to 1918. Kassel University Press, Kassel 2010, p. 1 f. ( Online, PDF; 2.2 MB).
Josef Matzerath : Aspects of Saxon State Parliament History. Presidents and members of parliament from 1833 to 1952. Sächsischer Landtag, Dresden 2001, pp. 75f.

References

1820 births
1901 deaths
German politicians
German Conservative Party politicians
Members of the Reichstag of the German Empire